New Finnish Grammar is a 2000 novel by the Italian writer Diego Marani. It was translated from the Italian by Judith Landry and published by Dedalus Books in 2011. In Italy, the book won the Grinzane Cavour Prize in 2001. The English edition was shortlisted for the 2012 Independent Foreign Fiction Prize and the 2012 Best Translated Book Award.

The plot begins in 1943 Trieste, Italy, where a military doctor, originally from Finland but enlisted in a German hospital ship, finds an unidentified man who is seriously wounded. The man recovers from his wound but seems to have lost his memory and even his language. The doctor believes the man to be a Finnish sailor who has somehow ended up in Italy, like himself. The doctor attempts to reconstruct the man's identity, to teach him Finnish, and eventually arranges his "return" to Helsinki to find his past.

See also
 2000 in literature
 Italian literature

References

2000 novels
Italian historical novels
Fiction set in 1943
Novels set in the 1940s
Novels set in Trieste
Novels set in Finland
20th-century Italian novels